Kõnnu may refer to several places in Estonia:

Kõnnu, Harju County, village in Kuusalu Parish, Harju County
Kõnnu, Jõgeva County, village in Torma Parish, Jõgeva County
Kõnnu, Pärnu County, village in Vändra Parish, Pärnu County
Kõnnu, Põlva County, village in Räpina Parish, Põlva County
Kõnnu, Pihtla Parish, village in Pihtla Parish, Saare County
Kõnnu, Valjala Parish, village in Valjala Parish, Saare County
Kõnnu, Tartu County, village in Võnnu Parish, Tartu County